Nerchinsk (Nershüü; , Nerchüü;) is a town and the administrative center of Nerchinsky District in Zabaykalsky Krai, Russia, located on the left bank of the Nercha River,  above its confluence with the Shilka River,  east of Lake Baikal, about  west of the Chinese border, and  east of Chita, the administrative center of the krai. Population:    6,713 (1897).

Town name in other languages
Two important treaties between the Russian Empire and Manchu China  mention Nerchinsk: the 1689 Treaty of Nerchinsk and the 1727 Treaty of Kyakhta. Non-Russian comments on these treaties or on the history of the town may mention other names:
Latin: Nipchou or Nipcha (however, the Treaty of Kyakhta called the town Nipkoa)
Manchu: Nibcu hoton
Chinese: 尼布楚; Pinyin: Níbùchǔ

History

The fort of Nerchinsk dates from 1654.  founded the town four years later; in that year he opened direct communication between the Russian settlements in Transbaikalia and those on the Amur River which had been founded by Cossacks and fur-traders from the Yakutsk region. In 1689 Russia and China signed the Treaty of Nerchinsk, which stopped the farther advance of the Russians into the basin of the Amur for two centuries (see Sino-Russian border conflicts).

After that, Nerchinsk became the chief center for Russian trade with China. The opening of the western route through Mongolia, via Urga, and the establishment of a custom-house at Kyakhta in 1728 diverted this trade into a new channel. But Nerchinsk acquired fresh importance from the influx of immigrants, mostly exiles, into eastern Dauria, from the discovery of rich mines and from the arrival of great numbers of convicts to the Nerchinsk katorga. Ultimately Nerchinsk became the chief town of Transbaikalia.

The famous English adventurer and engineer Samuel Bentham visited Nerchinsk in 1782. Bentham had seen a potential for Nerchinsk as a base for access to the Sea of Okhotsk, provided the Chinese would authorize navigation on the Amur River. Such a venture would have opened up the possibility of fur trade with the Pacific Ocean, as far as the Chinese port of Canton.

In 1812, Nerchinsk was transferred from the banks of the Shilka to its present site, on account of floods. The town relinquished its supremacy to Chita in the late 19th century, when the Trans-Siberian Railway bypassed it.

According to George Kennan, "a few of the Decembrist conspirators of 1825" and "thousands of Polish insurgents" from their unsuccessful insurrection of 1863" were transported to the Nerchinsk silver-mining district.

20th century
In the early 20th century, Nerchinsk was built of wood, and its lower areas frequently suffered from inundations. The inhabitants supported themselves mainly by agriculture, tobacco-growing and cattle-breeding; a few merchants traded in furs and cattle, in brick-tea from China, and in manufactured wares from Russia. Gold-mines in the vicinity were owned and developed by the Butin family of merchants, whose Neo-Moorish palace now accessible for visitors.

Nerchinsk today 
 Nerchinsk is home to some small electromechanical and food-processing industries. It has a small museum, established in 1884. Among its sights are the Resurrection Cathedral, built in the Neoclassical style in 1825 to commemorate the city's relocation, its belltower destroyed by the Communists. The site of old Nerchinsk is marked by the Assumption Monastery, the oldest in Dauria, founded in 1664. Its cathedral, consecrated in 1712, is the easternmost building in the Muscovite Baroque style.

Administrative and municipal status
Within the framework of administrative divisions, Nerchinsk serves as the administrative center of Nerchinsky District, to which it is directly subordinated. As a municipal division, the town of Nerchinsk, together with one rural locality (the selo of Makeyevka), is incorporated within Nerchinsky Municipal District as Nerchinskoye Urban Settlement.

Transportation

It was abandoned in the 1990s. The substandard runway length suggests a 1950s design.

References

Notes

Sources

Cities and towns in Zabaykalsky Krai
Transbaikal Oblast
Populated places established in 1658
17th-century establishments in Russia
1658 establishments in Russia